Makara Vilakku is a 1980 Indian Malayalam film,  directed by P. K. Joseph. The film stars Jose, Sankaradi, Sumesh and Prathapachandran in the lead roles. The film has musical score by K. J. Joy.

Cast
Jose
Sankaradi
Sumesh
Prathapachandran
Sathaar
Aranmula Ponnamma
Balan K. Nair
Jayanthi
Kanakadurga
Vazhoor Rajan

Soundtrack
The music was composed by K. J. Joy and the lyrics were written by Sreekumaran Thampi.

References

External links
 

1980 films
1980s Malayalam-language films